How to Have an Accident in the Home is a 1956 animated short film featuring Donald Duck.  It was released by Walt Disney Productions.

Plot
J.J. Fate lectures on how accidents aren't caused by "Fate", they are caused by people.  Donald Duck is used as an example, being extremely accident prone. He highlights a series of mishaps that are caused, not by "fate", but by Donald's carelessness.

Voice cast
Clarence Nash as Donald Duck
Bill Thompson as J.J. Fate

Home media
The short was released on November 11, 2008 on Walt Disney Treasures: The Chronological Donald, Volume Four: 1951-1961.

References

External links
 
 

1956 films
1956 animated films
1950s Disney animated short films
Donald Duck short films
Films produced by Walt Disney
CinemaScope films
1950s English-language films
1950s American films